Joseph Stillman Hubbard (7 September 1823 – 16 August 1863) was an American astronomer from New Haven, Connecticut. He graduated from Yale University in 1843, whither he had been attracted by Ebenezer Porter Mason, then one of Yale’s enthusiastic astronomers. Subsequently he studied mathematics and astronomy at home, and also taught for a while in a classical school, but early in 1844 he went to Philadelphia as assistant of Sears Cook Walker, who had charge of the observatory of the high-school in that city.

In the autumn of the same year he was appointed computer of the observations of latitude and longitude made on Captain John Charles Frémont’s expedition across the Rocky mountains. This work was accomplished so successfully that Professor Alexander Dallas Bache, Colonel John Charles Frémont, and Senator Thomas Hart Benton used their influence with Sec. George Bancroft to have him appointed professor of mathematics in the navy. He was so commissioned on 7 May 1845 and was immediately assigned to duty at the Washington Observatory, of which he continued to be an officer during the remainder of his life.

The first extended computation made by Prof. Hubbard after his assignment to the observatory was the determination of the zodiacs of all the known asteroids, except four previously published in Germany.

In November 1848 he presented to the Smithsonian institution the zodiacs of Vesta, Astrea, Hebe, Flora, and Metis. During the following year he prepared those of Hygea, Parthenope, and Clio, followed later by that of Egeria; and, although he published no others, it was his intention to prepare the zodiac for each successively discovered asteroid.

His skill as an observer and computer is further shown in valuable material published in the volumes of the “Washington Observations”, and his work comprised many special investigations. Of these the most important include his discussions of “The Orbit of the Great Comet of 1843”, originally contributed and published through several issues of Benjamin Apthorp Gould’s “Astronomical Journal”.

His later but equally valuable researches “On the Orbit of Biela’s Comet in 1845-’6” (1858), “Results of Additional Investigations respecting the two Nuclei of Biela’s Comet” (1854), and “On Biela’s Comet” (1858), which form the accepted authority on the subject, also appeared in the “Astronomical Journal”, to which he was a frequent contributor, and twice during Dr. Benjamin Apthorp Gould’s absence from the country he was its acting editor.

In 1845 he was elected a member of the National Institute of Washington, and in 1852 a fellow of the American Philosophical Society. Joseph Stillman Hubbard was also an original member of the National Academy of Sciences.

References 
 Appleton’s Cyclopedia vol.3 p. 292 (out of copyright)

External links
National Academy of Sciences Biographical Memoir
Yale Obituary Record

American astronomers
Scientists from New Haven, Connecticut
Yale University alumni
1823 births
1863 deaths
Members of the United States National Academy of Sciences